The 2022–23 season is FC Midtjylland's 24th season of existence, and their 22nd consecutive season in the Danish Superliga, the top tier of football in Denmark. As a result of the club's runner-up finish in the 2021–22 Danish Superliga, it competed in the 2022–23 UEFA Champions League through the Third Qualifying Round, and subsequently competed in the 2022-23 UEFA Europa League, advancing to the Knockout Round Play-offs.

Squad

Out on loan

Non-competitive

Pre-season friendlies

Mid-season friendlies

Atlantic Cup

Competitive

Competition record

Danish Superliga

Regular season

Results by round - Regular season

Relegation round

Results by round – Relegation round

Regular season

Relegation season

Danish Cup

UEFA Champions League

UEFA Europa League

Group stage

Knock-out round play-offs

Statistics

Appearances 

Includes all competitive matches.

Goalscorers 

This includes all competitive matches.

Assists 

This includes all competitive matches.

Clean sheets 

This includes all competitive matches.

Disciplinary record 

This includes all competitive matches.

References

External links 
 FC Midtjylland  in Danish

FC Midtjylland seasons
Danish football clubs 2022–23 season
Midtjylland